is a former Japanese swimmer who competed in the 1992 Summer Olympics and in the 1996 Summer Olympics.

References

1978 births
Living people
Japanese female butterfly swimmers
Olympic swimmers of Japan
Swimmers at the 1992 Summer Olympics
Swimmers at the 1996 Summer Olympics
Asian Games medalists in swimming
Asian Games silver medalists for Japan
Asian Games bronze medalists for Japan
Medalists at the 1994 Asian Games
Universiade medalists in swimming
Swimmers at the 1994 Asian Games
Universiade silver medalists for Japan
Medalists at the 1997 Summer Universiade
20th-century Japanese women